Alticor is a privately owned American corporation which is run by the DeVos family and the Van Andel family. It was established in 1999 to serve as the parent company for a handful of business ventures, most notably the multi-level marketing company Amway and Amway Global, and a manufacturing and distribution company, Access Business Group. 

In 2006, Alticor purchased cosmetics maker Gurwitch Products from Neiman Marcus Group Inc., and operated it as a wholly owned subsidiary until Gurwitch was acquired by Shiseido in 2016.

Alticor Corporate Enterprises
Founded in 1956, Alticor Corporate Enterprises is a subsidiary holding corporation of Alticor's non-direct selling companies: Amway Hotel Corporation, Gurwitch Products, Interleukin Genetics, Metagenics and Fulton Innovation. Pyxis Innovations Inc., formed in 2000, purchase ownership in Interleukin Genetics and is a wholly owned subsidiary of Alticor Inc.

AHC+Hospitality
AHC+Hospitality, formerly Amway Hotel Corporation, is the Alticor hotel subsidiary. AHC owns several hotels in Grand Rapids and the British Virgin Islands.

The Amway Corporation purchased, refurbished, expanded and renamed the Pantlind Hotel to the Amway Grand Hotel in 1981.

In February 2017, CWD Real Estate Development indicated plans to convert a downtown Grand Rapids building into an AC Hotels by Marriott with 130-room to be operated by AHC. By May 2017, Amway Hotel Corporation changed its name to AHC+Hospitality.

References

External links 

Direct marketing
Privately held companies based in Michigan
Multi-level marketing companies
Companies based in Kent County, Michigan
Holding companies established in 1999
1999 establishments in Michigan
Family-owned companies of the United States